British Aerospace plc v Green [1995] ICR 1006 is a UK labour law case, concerning redundancy.

Facts
British Aerospace decided that 530 jobs needed to be reduced from its 7000 strong plant. All 7000 were given individual assessments. Of the 530 dismissed, 235 of the low scorers contested the dismissals’ fairness. British Aerospace refused to disclose the forms of the ones not dismissed.

The Tribunal held the forms had to be disclosed. British Aerospace appealed.

Judgment
Waite LJ held the forms did not need to be disclosed unless it was to deal with a specific issue that had been raised, like an allegation that the wrong criteria were used on a particular employee. Any close scrutiny of how the transparent objective procedure is applied would be too much of an interference with the legitimacy of the employer's discretion. The Employment Appeal Tribunal was right to overturn the Tribunal because, first, the quick settlement of disputes spoke in favour of not requiring disclosure, given the absence of special circumstances for it. And second, the rule that documents only need to be disclosed when an issue is raised is in tune with county court rule O 14 R 8(1).

Notes

United Kingdom labour case law
Court of Appeal (England and Wales) cases
1995 in British law
1995 in case law